The Uruguayan Championship 1928 was the 26th season of Uruguay's top-flight football league.

Overview
The tournament consisted of a two-wheel championship of all against all. It involved sixteen teams, and the champion was Peñarol.

Teams

League standings

References

Uruguay - List of final tables (RSSSF)

Uruguayan Primera División seasons
Uru
1928 in Uruguayan football